The 1906 Scottish Cup Final was played on 28 April 1906 at Ibrox Park in Govan (today part of Glasgow) and was the final of the 33rd season of the Scottish Cup. Heart of Midlothian and Third Lanark contested the match, won 1–0 by Hearts thanks to an 81st-minute goal from George Wilson.

Final

Teams

References

External links
 RSSSF: Scottish Cup 1905–06
 Scottish Football Archive

1906
Cup Final
Heart of Midlothian F.C. matches
Third Lanark A.C. matches
1900s in Glasgow
April 1906 sports events